The Pomme d'Or is a prize for excellence in the tourism industry awarded by FIJET, the European association of professional travel writers and journalists. It is awarded yearly to an organization, location or person for recognising superior efforts in promoting and raising the level of tourism.

List of recipients:
 1971 - Italy, Sicily
 1971 - Belgium, Bokrijk
 1971 - Netherlands, Efteling
 1972 - Yugoslavia, Sveti Stefan
 1972 - Hungary, Estergone
 1972 - Ireland, "horse carriage excursions/holidays"
 1973 - France, Thoiry-en-Yvelines
 1973 - Belgium, Arthur Haulot (General Commissioner of Tourism)
 1974 - United Kingdom, York
 1975 - Romania, Bukovina
 1976 - Germany, Rothenburg ob der Tauber
 1977 - Not presented
 1978 - Yugoslavia, Sarajevo
 1979 - Bulgaria, Rila Monastery
 1980 - France, Pézenas
 1981 - Spain, Robert Lonati (Secretary General of World Tourism Organization - WTO)
 1982 - Russia, Suzdal
 1983 - Finland, Turku
 1984 - Turkey, Antalya
 1985 - Spain, Palos de la Frontera
 1986 - Poland, Kraków
 1987 - Cyprus, Nicosia
 1988 - Portugal, Funchal/Madeira and Greece, Mont Pelion
 1989 - Not presented
 1990 - Colombia, Cartagena de Indias
 1991 - Tunisia, Utinah
 1992 - Not presented
 1993 - Belgium, Antwerpen
 1994 - Egypt, South Sinai
 1995 - Cuba, Santiago de Cuba
 1996 - Spain, Caceres
 1996 - Dubrovnik, Croatia
 1997 - Russia, Moscow and Yuri Luzhkov (ex-mayor of Moscow)
 1998 - Not presented
 1999 - Not presented
 2000 - Belgium, Mol Lake District
 2001 - Lebanon, City of Tyr
 2002 - Egypt, Sharm el Sheikh
 2003 - Turkey, Nemrut Dag
 2004 - Czech Republic, Brno
 2005 - Croatia, Split
 2006 - Spain, Calpe
 2009 - Spain, Cantabria & three locations in Romania: Sibiu, Danube Delta and Blue Air 
 2010 - Egypt, Luxor
 2011 - Croatia
 2012 - Caltagirone (Italy), Hamamönü (Turkey), Alexandria (Egypt), Foundation Kobarov (Slovenia) and Český Krumlov
 2013 - Opatija (Croatia)
 2014 - Targu Jiu (Romania)
 2015 - Dubrovnik (Croatia); Moscow city (Russia), Palic (Serbia)
 2016 - Ypres (Belgium), Ljubljana (Slovenia), Plovdiv (Bulgaria)
 2017  - Kazan (Russia), Bratislava (Slovakia), Konya (Turkey)
 2018 - Palermo, Ekaterineburg (Russia),  Dyarbakir (Turkey)

References

External links
 FIJET website

Hospitality industry awards
Travel writing